Hemicladus callipus is a species of beetle in the family Cerambycidae. It was described by Buquet in 1857. It is known from Brazil.

References

Calliini
Beetles described in 1857